Kurt Jung-Alsen (18 June 1915 – 20 December 1976) was a German film director and screenwriter. He directed 24 films between 1954 and 1976.

Selected filmography
 The Call of the Sea (1951)
 Duped Till Doomsday (1957)
 Polonia-Express (1957)

References

External links

1915 births
1976 deaths
Film people from Bavaria
People from Starnberg (district)
Recipients of the Heinrich Greif Prize